Lynn is a civil parish in County Westmeath, Ireland.

Lynn is one of 10 civil parishes in the barony of Fartullagh in the Province of Leinster.

Lynn civil parish comprises 12 townlands: Ardillon, Burnellstown, Catherinestown, Clonmoyle, Corbally, Gainestown, Glendevine, Gorteen, Lynn, Tornanstown. Tullanisky and Vilanstown.

The neighbouring civil parishes are: Mullingar to the north, Killucan (barony of Farbill), to the east and Enniscoffey and Moylisker to the south.

A well-preserved ring fort can be seen in Lynn townland in the northwestern part of the parish, near the boundary with Mullingar parish.

In the early fourteenth century, the manor of Lynn was bought from the de Pitchford family by the English-born judge Sir John de Fressingfield and his wife Alice. Sir John applied for permission to endow a chantry there.

References

External links
Lynn civil parish at the IreAtlas Townland Data Base
Lynn civil parish at townlands.ie
Lynn civil parish at the Placenames Database of Ireland

Civil parishes of County Westmeath